The 2001 IAAF Grand Prix was the seventeenth edition of the annual global series of one-day track and field competitions organized by the International Association of Athletics Federations (IAAF). The series was divided into four levels: 2001 IAAF Golden League, Grand Prix I and Grand Prix II, and IAAF Permit Meetings. There were seven Golden League meets, Grand Prix I featured 10 meetings from 6 May to 22 July and Grand Prix II featured 11 meetings from 1 March to 2 September, making a combined total of 28 meetings for the series. An additional 12 IAAF Outdoor Permit Meetings were attached to the circuit.

Compared to the previous season, the Oregon Track Classic and IAAF Grand Prix Palo Alto were included for the first time, the Qatar Athletic Grand Prix 1 was reintroduced after a year's break, and the Pontiac Grand Prix Invitational was dropped from the calendar.

Performances on designated events on the circuit earned athletes points which qualified them for entry to the 2001 IAAF Grand Prix Final, held on 9 September in Melbourne, Australia. Middle-distance runner Violeta Szekely was the points leader for the series, taking a series record high of 116 points from eight meetings. The highest scoring male athlete was middle-distance runner André Bucher, who scored 102 points. Another middle-distance runner, Maria Mutola, had the second highest with 105. Three men also reached 100 points: hurdler Allen Johnson, and distance runners Hicham El Guerrouj and Paul Bitok.

Meetings

Points standings

Overall men

Overall women

References

Points standings
2001 GRAND PRIX STANDINGS - Overall Men. IAAF. Retrieved 2019-08-31.
2001 GRAND PRIX STANDINGS - Overall Women. IAAF. Retrieved 2019-08-31. 

2001
IAAF Grand Prix